László Szűcs (born 14 March 1991) is a Hungarian former professional footballer who played as a centre-back. He made his professional debut with Jahn Regensburg in the 3. Liga on 28 August 2010 as a half-time substitute during a 3–0 home defeat to Eintracht Braunschweig.

References

External links 
 
 

1991 births
Living people
People from Tatabánya
Hungarian footballers
Association football central defenders
3. Liga players
Nemzeti Bajnokság I players
Ferencvárosi TC footballers
SSV Jahn Regensburg players
Vasas SC players
FC Tatabánya players
Hungarian expatriate footballers
Hungarian expatriate sportspeople in Germany
Expatriate footballers in Germany
Sportspeople from Komárom-Esztergom County